Ihda (Dedication)' is the debut album by DAM released in November 2006 by British record label Red Circle Music - RCM. It is DAM's debut album and the first Palestinian hip hop album. The album was licensed to EMI Arabia to distribute it in the Middle East except for Palestine where it was distributed independently. The album contains 15 tracks, the cover of the album was taken by the Palestinian photographer Steve Sabella.

Track listing
"Mukadime (Intro)"
"Mali Huriye (I Don't Have Freedom)" ft. Alaa Azam and Anat Egbariye
"Ng'ayer Bukra (Change Tomorrow)" 
"Warde (Flower)" ft. SAZ
"Inkilab (Revolution)"
"Ya Sayidati (My Lady)" ft. Suhell Fodi from Zaman
"Al Huriye Unt'a (Freedom for My Sisters)" ft. Safa' Hathut from Arapeyat
"Hibuna Ishtruna (Love Us and Buy Us)"
"Mes Endroits (My Hood)" ft. Nikkfurie from La Caution
"Usset Hub (A Love Story)" ft. Rawda Suleiman and Ibrahim Sakalla
"G'areeb Fi Bladi (Stranger in My Own Country)" ft. Amal Bisharat
"Kalimat (Words)" 
"Sawa' al Zaman (Driver of Fate)"
"Ihda' (Dedication)" ft. Ibrahim Sakalla

The Stories Behind Ihda' Tracks

Intro (Mukadime) 
 Produced & mixed by Ori Shochat.

The song samples Egyptian leader Gamal Abdel Nasser in an effort to build a bridge between the old generation and the new generation. The song is a recording of Nasser talking about a new day and a new generation that will make that difference over a beat

I have no Freedom (Mali Huriye)
 Produced by Ori Shochat
 Mixed by Tam Cooper
 Oud: Alaa' Azzam
 Kanoun: Mahran Mer'eb
 Singing: Alaa' Azzam & Suhell Fodi from Zaman and a former member of Wala'at
 Singing girl: Anat Egbareye

DAM were invited by Juliano Mer Khamis to his house to watch his documentary "Arna's Children" and were so moved by the film that they decided to dedicate a song to the film, they picked the melody that the kids and the locals are singing in a theatre day in the Jenin camp, they fell in love with the line "Why are all the children of the world free but not us?", which they used as the song's hook. Since the hook ends with a question, they provide an answer at the end of the song in the form of a quotation from famed Syrian poet Nizar al-Qabbani's poem "We Need a New Generation", spoken by 10-year-old Anat Egbareye.

The song has been used in the following films and TV shows:
Where in the World Is Osama bin Laden? (2008), an American documentary by Morgan Spurlock, director of Supersize me
Forgiveness (2007), by the American/Israeli director Udi Aloni
Check Point Rocks (2009) Fermin Muguruza and Javier Corcuera 
Arab Labor, the hit TV show by Sayed Kashua

Change Tomorrow (Ng'ayer Bukra)
 Produced & Mixed by Ran Harush

The song is a sequel to the preceding song. The hook, sung by kids from the Arabic ghettos of Lyd, goes "We want education, we want progress, to find the strength so we change tomorrow." The song also features a sample from old children's show Iftah Ya Simsim (Arab Sesame Street). The song made a big buzz when it was used in Palestinian writer Sayed Kashua's successful TV show Avoda Aravit (Arab Labor).

Flower (Wardeh)
 Featuring Sameh Zakoout (AKA SAZ) and Jamil Nafar
 Mixed by Tam Cooper

Warde is a slang used in Lyd, meaning "brother, dude, my man, etc." The song is a boast about who is the best on the mic.

Revolution (Inkilab)
 Produced by Arye Avtan 
 Mixed by Tam Cooper

A Suhell Nafar solo and the first Palestinian reggae song.

My Lady (Ya Sayedati)
 Feature Suhell Fodi from Zaman and a former member of Wala'at
 Produced and Mixed by Ran Harush
 Oud: Alaa Azam
 Kanoun: Mahran Mer'eb

The first single of the album, released Valentine's Day 2006. Its music video, directed by Marwan Asaad, was the first from the album.

Freedom for my Sister (Al Huriye Unt'a)
 Produced and Mixed by Ran Harush

Tamer's first solo in the album, the song protests against the oppression of women. In their shows DAM present the song by saying "How can we beat the occupation with one hand? We need the other one, so let's stop choking our sisters and instead use the hand to fight." The song features Safaa Hathut, the first Palestinian female rapper from Arapeyat Acka.

Its DAM (Da Dam)
 Produced by Karem Matar 
 Mixed by Tam Cooper

The song represents DAM, explaining who they are and what their message is. It samples a very popular Egyptian play "Madraset al Mushag'ibin – The school of hooligans" with Adel Imam, Said Saleh, Ahmad Zaki and Younes Shalabi.
In one of their interviews, DAM explained how hard it was to clear the sample since there was no official organization to request it from. While they were in Berlin Film Festival to participate in the opening of Udi Aloni's film "Forgiveness – Mehilot" that they played a role in, they met with the Egyptian actor Nour El-Sherif and spoke to him about the problem of the sample, he put them in contact with Said Saleh who signed the clearance and faxed it to DAM without any payment.

Hibuna Ishtruna (Love us buy us)
 Produced by Ori Shochat
 Mixed by Tam Cooper

"We made a catchy chorus without any meaning just so you can play it in the Radio", one of DAM's funniest song as they mock the meaningless songs that are taking over the radios. In a lecture DAM gave at the University of Rome, Italy about Palestinian hip hop as a form of resistance, they explained that they love pop music but do not like the fact that it is the only thing played on the radio. As such, they say even if the media was playing only protest songs they will sing "We made a protest song just so you can play us".
DAM: "The massage is that our culture like any culture is colorful, we have pop stars, we have alternative music, we have hardcore artists, let's give a shot to everyone." One of the lines of the songs, Tamer Nafar: "If you shake your head you will move your brain an get though out of it, but we only shake the ass, so all we get is shit."

My Hood (Mes Endroits) feat. Nikkfurie/La Caution
Another funny song, a sarcastic view of ghettos, DAM explained that in the beginning they used to rap about their ghetto, when they succeeded in Palestine they found out that the world is bigger than their hood and when they started touring around the world they discovered that the world is bigger than Palestine. DAM explains that if the Israeli Police are working with the Atlanta Police to oppress minorities, then the minorities should work together and fight the oppressors. This is why they chose to work with French rapper Nikkfurie of La Caution, as DAM will talk about their ghetto in Israel and he will talk about his ghetto in France.

A Love Story (Usset Hub)
 Produced by Ori Shochat & Ran Harush
 Mixed by Ran Harush

Tamer's second solo in the album, the song has no chorus. The song is a love story, and the title was originally a placeholder name that was kept because time constraints prevented them from choosing another title. In one of DAM's performances, they started the song by reading a quote from the Egyptian writer Nawal El Saadawi where she explains how love is treated by the Arab society, the lovers are like 2 beautiful flowers and society is like the bees, they suck the honey and the sweetness of it. The song features Palestinian actress Rawda Suleiman in the role of the girl and the mother and the singer/actor Ibahim Sakalla as Tamer's friend in the song.

Stranger in my own Country (G'areeb fi Bladi)
 Features Amal Bisharat and Ibrahim Sakalla
 Produced by Ori Shohat and Ran Harush
 Mixed by Ran Harush
 Oud: Alaa Azam 
 The chorus was written by Abir al Azinati

Starting the song with the voice of the late Tawfiq Ziad, DAM went to visit his family before they released the song and they got a clearance to use his voice and words. The song continues with verses that explains to the Arab world the catch 22 that faces Palestinians who live in Israel, seen in lyrics like "The Arab world treats us as Israelis and Israel treats us as Palestinians, I am a stranger in my own country." In the third verse, Tamer raps the names of the 13 Palestinian civilians killed by Israeli forces in October 2000 demonstrations as a form of wordplay, using their names as verbs. Tamer explained in an interview that "it took him more than a month to deliver the political message using specific names as verbs and only in 16 bars and not more, it was challenging but worth it, sometimes after a show someone surprises me and tells me I am the sister of one of the martyrs, or the mother, and they come to talk to me after hearing his name in the song, it is sad but it moves me"

Words (Kalimat)
Mahmood's solo in the album, a hardcore song for the streets, Mahmood is explaining the important role of the lyrics/words and speeches during the history of the world. The chorus is samples from DAM's old songs. Originally the song was recorded over the Fairuz sample "Habbaytak Bissayf" but after having problems with the clearance they recomposed it.
Lines from the song, Mahmood Jreri: "I am the word's master but I am their slave as well" 
"And those who are gifted, can use them to walk through borders
and in some governments, it’s forbidden to give words freedom
But if you choke them and kill them then it's allowed"

Driver of Faith (Sawa' al Zaman)
 Produced & Mixed by Edi Sumeran

Hany Abu-Assad, director of the film Paradise Now, which won a Golden Globe for Best Foreign Language Film and was nominated for an Academy Award in the same category, said about using the song: "I just finished editing my documentary Ford Transit (2002) and I had in one of my scenes a song by Dr. Dre – Big Egos, after meeting DAM they offered me replace the song, if the scenes were about Palestine then it should be backed by Palestinian Hip Hop and DAM were the right people for that, they were limited by the creation of the song since the scene is already edited, so they took Dr. Dre song as a reference and came out with something the fits perfect and new, me and my staff watched the scene with the both songs and we all voted for the new DAM song, Driver of Fate, which lyrically goes with the film, but not one on one, more metaphorically"

Dedication (Ihda')
 The song is featuring Ibrahim Sakalla
 Produced by Ori Shochat
 Mixed by Tam Cooper

A review from the Arabic Hip Hop Heads website states that "The final track is a bittersweet personal Dedication (Ihda’) to all those who supported DAM - a good song indeed." The song features Ibrahim Sakalla and is composed by Ori Shochat.

Awards
 Album of the week in Germany, Berlin at 2006.
 Best Palestinian art work for Al Qattan Organization on 2008.
 Best Palestinian Rap album at the Palestinian Manassa music awards 2011.

References

External links
 Album lyrics

2006 debut albums
DAM (band) albums
Albums produced by Ori Shochat